Maiko is a female Japanese given name. Notable people with the name include:

, Japanese swimmer
 Maiko Gogoladze (born 1991), Georgian long jumper
, Japanese tennis player
, Miss Japan Universe 2010
, Japanese actress
, Japanese composer and arranger
 Maiko Jeong Shun Lee, Viscountess Rothermere (born 1949), British viscountess
, Japanese actress
, Japanese actress
, Japanese volleyball player
, Japanese gymnast
, Japanese singer
, Japanese women's footballer
, Japanese ice hockey player
, Japanese musician
, Japanese sailor
, Japanese actress
 Maiko Watson, member of the Canadian pop group Sugar Jones
 Maiko Zulu, Zambian musician

Fictional characters
 Maico Katou (マイコ・カトウ), a character in the manga series Yu-Gi-Oh! R
 Maiko Kaji (梶 舞子), a supporting character in the manga and anime series Hataraki Man
 Maiko (マイコ), a secondary character in the manga series Girls und Panzer: Ribbon Warrior and Girls und Panzer: Das Finale

Japanese feminine given names